Angut-e Sharqi Rural District is in the Central District of Ungut County, Ardabil province, Iran. Prior to the formation of the county, this rural district was in Angut District of Germi County. At the census of 2006, its population was 9,532 in 1,922 households; there were 8,207 inhabitants in 1,967 households at the following census of 2011; and in the most recent census of 2016, the population of the rural district was 6,969 in 2,068 households. The largest of its 54 villages was Garmi Angut, with 491 people.

References 

Rural Districts of Ardabil Province

Populated places in Ardabil Province